El Mehdi Sidqy (born 6 January 1984 in Mohammédia) better known as Mido, is a Moroccan footballer who currently plays for Victoria Hotspurs in Malta.

Career

Club
In December 2009, he signed half year contract with Jagiellonia Białystok.

On 8 January 2019, Mido joined Senglea Athletic in Malta. In August 2019, he moved to Victoria Hotspurs.

Successes

 1x Bahrain Cup Winner (2004) with Al-Shabab Club
 1x Polish Cup Winner (2010) with Jagiellonia Białystok.

References

External links
  
  Jagiellonia Białystok official site 
 Mido at Victoria Hotspur's website

1984 births
Living people
Moroccan footballers
Moroccan expatriate footballers
Association Salé players
ES Zarzis players
Bahrain SC players
Jagiellonia Białystok players
Górnik Łęczna players
Piast Gliwice players
SCC Mohammédia players
El Mehdi Sidqy
El Mehdi Sidqy
El Mehdi Sidqy
Senglea Athletic F.C. players
Victoria Hotspurs F.C. players
Ekstraklasa players
I liga players
Maltese Premier League players
People from Mohammedia
Association football defenders
Moroccan expatriate sportspeople in Tunisia
Moroccan expatriate sportspeople in Thailand
Moroccan expatriate sportspeople in Poland
Moroccan expatriate sportspeople in Bahrain
Expatriate footballers in Tunisia
Expatriate footballers in Poland
Expatriate footballers in Thailand
Expatriate footballers in Bahrain
Expatriate footballers in Malta